Sunil Kumar Kushwaha alias Sunil Kumar is an Indian politician. He was elected to the Lok Sabha, the lower house of the Parliament of India from Valmiki Nagar, Bihar in the 2020 Bypoll of Valmiki Nagar as member of the Janata Dal (United).

Personal life 
His father's name is Baidyanath Prasad Mahto.

References

India MPs 2019–present
Lok Sabha members from Bihar
Janata Dal (United) politicians
Year of birth missing (living people)
Living people